"Tempo" is a song by South Korean–Chinese boy band Exo, released on November 2, 2018, as the lead single of the band's fifth studio album Don't Mess Up My Tempo. The music video was released on the same date. The Chinese version features member Lay, who has been on an extended hiatus since "For Life" in 2016.

Background
"Tempo" was called "a rhythmical hip-hop-leaning dance track that showcases a cappella harmonies as they send warnings not to 'mess up his tempo' with their lover". Billboard stated the preview "starts off with a dramatic synth melody, pulsating beat and the phrase 'I can't believe'." On February 24, 2019, the Korean music video surpassed 100 million views on YouTube. Exo promoted the album and song with teasers throughout October 2018, including a 30-second Tempo Concept short film, showing the band as a biker gang, which was a preview of "Tempo".

Accolades

Charts

Sales

References 

2018 singles
2018 songs
Exo songs
Korean-language songs
SM Entertainment singles
Billboard Korea K-Pop number-one singles